Rita Todorova (born 18 August 1958) is a Bulgarian rower.

References 
 
 

1958 births
Living people
Bulgarian female rowers
Rowers at the 1980 Summer Olympics
Rowers at the 1988 Summer Olympics
Olympic silver medalists for Bulgaria
Olympic rowers of Bulgaria
Olympic medalists in rowing
Medalists at the 1980 Summer Olympics